Furze Platt railway station is a railway station in the town of Maidenhead, Berkshire, England.

History
The Wycombe Railway (WR), part of which now forms the greater portion of the Marlow branch line, opened between Maidenhead and High Wycombe in 1854 with the first station out of Maidenhead being .

The Great Western Railway absorbed the Wycombe Railway in 1867 and opened "Furze Platt Halt" on 5 July 1937 to serve the area's growing population. British Rail renamed the station "Furze Platt" on 5 May 1969.

Train services in each direction are hourly during the day, and approximately half-hourly at weekday peak times with trains running to  only.

The single platform station has basic facilities including a waiting shelter, a customer help point, and a ticket office is open weekdays from 6:45 to 11:30. The station is next to a level crossing on Harrow Lane, Maidenhead.

References

External links

Railway stations in Berkshire
DfT Category E stations
Former Great Western Railway stations
Railway stations in Great Britain opened in 1937
Railway stations served by Great Western Railway
1937 establishments in England